Sasonichus is a monotypic genus of Asian brushed trapdoor spiders containing the single species, Sasonichus sullivani. It was first described by Reginald Innes Pocock in 1900, and has only been found in India. The species Sipalolasma arthrapophysis was briefly placed here before being moved to Sipalolasma in 1985.

References

Barychelidae
Monotypic Mygalomorphae genera
Spiders of the Indian subcontinent
Taxa named by R. I. Pocock